MasterChef Asia is a regional competitive cooking game show based on the original British show MasterChef. The show is produced by Lifetime Asia. A total of 15 home cooks from various regions across Asia (China, India, Indonesia, Malaysia, Philippines, Singapore, Taiwan, Vietnam) competed in the first season of MasterChef Asia. The show is judged by Hong Kong-born, culinary chef Susur Lee; 3-Michelin starred chef Bruno Ménard; and Singapore-born Audra Morrice, a MasterChef Australia finalist. From the MasterChef kitchen to off-site and overseas challenges, the 15 episodes will culminate in one home-cook winning the title of the first ever MasterChef Asia.

Guest Chefs 
 Chef Eric Teo, Chef Patron/Owner of ET Culinary Arts (1 October 2015)
 Dato' Dr. Fazley Yaakob, Winner of MasterChef Celebrity Malaysia and Chef Patron/Owner of SukaSucre Bistro in Cheras, Malaysia (8 October 2015)
 Chef Janice Wong, Chef Patron/Owner of 2am:dessertbar and 2am:lab in Singapore (5 November 2015)
 Chef Gaggan Anand, Chef Patron/Owner of  Gaggan in Bangkok, Thailand (10 December 2015, Season Finale)
 Chef Juna Rorimpandey, Celebrity Chef, and MasterChef Indonesia judge on season 1 and 2 (10 December 2015, Season Finale)
 Chef Justin Quek, Chef Patron/Owner of Sky On 57 in Singapore (10 December 2015, Season Finale)
 Chef Bjorn Shen, Author, Chef Patron/Owner of Artichoke in Singapore (10 December 2015, Season Finale)
 Chef David Pynt, Chef of Burnt Ends in Singapore (10 December 2015, Season Finale)
 Chef May Chow, Chef Patron/Owner of Little Bao in Hongkong (10 December 2015, Season Finale)

Contestants

Elimination table

 (WINNER) This cook won the competition.
 (RUNNER-UP) This cook received second place in the competition.
 (WIN) The cook won the individual challenge (Mystery Box Challenge or Invention Test) and received an advantage in the next challenge.
 (WIN) The cook was on the winning team in the Team/Pair Challenge and was safe.
 (LOW) The cook was on the losing team in the Team/Pair Challenge and was not safe.
 (IN) The cook was not selected as a top entry or bottom entry in a Team Challenge.
 (HIGH) The cook was one of the top entries in the individual challenge, but did not win.
 (IN) The cook was not selected as a top entry or bottom entry in the challenge.
 (IMM) The cook did not have to compete in that round of the competition and was safe from elimination.
 (LOW) The cook was one of the bottom entries in an individual elimination challenge, but was not the last person to advance.
 (LOW) The cook was one of the bottom entries in an individual elimination challenge, and was the last person to advance.
 (PT) The cook was on the losing team in the Team/Pair Challenge, competed in the Elimination Test, and advanced.
 (NPT) The cook was on the losing team in the Team/Pair Challenge, but was exempted from the Elimination Test.
 (ELIM) The cook was eliminated from MasterChef.

Episodes

International Broadcast

The programme is being broadcast in the Philippines by TV5 every Sunday night at 8pm, starting 8 November 2015. In Indonesia, every Saturday at 3pm on Global TV. Malaysia, Every Monday at 6:30pm on Astro Ria. In India  every Saturday at 10:00pm on Star World Premiere. In Singapore, on Channel 5, starting at 10.30 p.m, every Sunday.

References

Asia
2010s Singaporean television series
2015 Singaporean television series debuts
Non-British television series based on British television series